Suri is a 2000 Telugu-language film directed by Sankara Kumar (Editor Shankar) in his directorial debut. The film stars J. D. Chakravarthy and Priyanka Trivedi. It was produced by Tammareddy Bharadwaja. The lead actor J. D. Chakravarthy also provided the story, screenplay and dialogues for the film, though he was not credited in the movie credits. Suri released on 28 December 2000 and was a box-office disaster. 

J. D. Chakravarthy himself produced and directed the Hindi version of the film titled Durga (2002).

Cast
 J. D. Chakravarthy as Suri
 Priyanka as Gayatri
 Jaya Prakash Reddy as Ram Das
 Sayaji Shinde
  A. V. S. Subramanyam 
 Jagga Rao
 Uttej
 Tanikella Bharani

Production 
Shankar, who worked with Ram Gopal Varma and Krishna Vamsi as editor made his debut as a director with the film. Tammareddy Bharadwaja produced the film. Shankar handled both editing and direction. J. D. Chakravarthy who played lead the lead role also provided the story, screenplay and dialogues for the film. But, he was not credited for his writing work in the movie credits. Producer Tammareddy Bharadwaja attributed this to him lacking the required money to put the movie titles or even marketing the film in newspapers.

J. D. Chakravarthy himself produced and directed the Hindi version of the film titled Durga which released in March 2002.

Soundtrack
The music was composed by  Vidyasagar and released by Aditya Music.

Release 
The film released on 28 December 2000.

References

2001 films
Telugu films remade in other languages
Films scored by Vidyasagar
2000s Telugu-language films